Folakemi is a feminine given name. This may include the following: 

 Folakemi T. Odedina, Nigerian-born scientist and professor of pharmacy and medicine
 Folayemi "Fo" Wilson, American interdisciplinary artist, designer, writer, curator, and academic administrator.

Feminine given names
Nigerian feminine given names